Stefan Havlik (born September 10, 1975), a Slovak bodybuilder and also a soldier. IFBB Pro Bodybuilder. CEO and founder of www.workoutic.com.

Born in Košice, he currently resides in Miami. He's a World Champion in Amateur Bodybuiling (2003), and a quintuple European Champion in the same category (2001, 2006 + mix pair, 2010, 2011).

Bodybuilding competition overview 
 2000:
 European Amateur Championships – IFBB, Light-HeavyWeight, 6th
 2001:
 European Amateur Championships – IFBB, Light-HeavyWeight, 1st
 World Amateur Championships – IFBB, Light-HeavyWeight, 8th
 World Games, HeavyWeight, 4th
 2002:
 World Amateur Championships – IFBB, Light-HeavyWeight, 10th
 2003:
 World Amateur Championships – IFBB, MiddleWeight, 1st
 2005:
 European Amateur Championships – IFBB, Light-HeavyWeight, 3rd
 World Amateur Championships – IFBB, Light-HeavyWeight, 4th
 2006:
 European Amateur Championships – IFBB, Light-HeavyWeight, 1st
 World Amateur Championships – IFBB, HeavyWeight, 2nd
 2007:
 World Amateur Championships – IFBB, HeavyWeight, 2nd
 2009:
 World Amateur Championships – IFBB, HeavyWeight, 10th
 2010:
 European Amateur Championships – IFBB, Light-HeavyWeight, 1st
 European Amateur Championships – IFBB, Light-HeavyWeight, Overall Winner
 2011:
 European Amateur Championships – IFBB, Light-HeavyWeight, 1st
 2012:
 Stefan was the overall winner of the Arnold Amateur Bodybuilding Competition held in Columbus Ohio March 3–5

 International GP Overall Winner:
 GP SLOVAKIA - SLOVAKIA				2001,2005,2006,2007
 CUP TATRA MOUNTAIN - SLOVAKIA			2005,2006,2007,2009
 INT. GROSSER PREISE VON OSTERRAICH - OSTERRAICH	2005
 GP ALL STARS FIBO - GERMANY			        2003
 AMINOSTAR CUP 05- CZECH REPUBLIC		        2005
 GP PEPA - CZECH REPUBLIC			        2005
 LOADED CUP - DENMARK				        2006
 GP CHARLEROI XV - BELGIUM			        2006
 STAVANGER OPEN - NORWAY				2009
 SANDEFJORD OPEN - NORWAY			        2010,2011
 ALEXANDER THE GREAT - GREECE			        2011

 IFBB PRO results:
 Wings of Strength Chicago 			2013		7th place
 Ferrigno Legacy	 - Santa Barbara		2014  		6th place
 Vencouver Pro                      		2015		4th place
 Tampa Pro                          		2015  		4th place
 Sacramento Pro                			2015		3rd place
 Texas Pro                            		2015  		5th place
 Europa Games                  			2015		5th place

Proportions 
 Height: 175 cm
 Weight: 115 kg
 Weight (in season): 105 kg

References

External links 
 

1975 births
Living people
Slovak bodybuilders
Slovak military personnel
Sportspeople from Bratislava
Sportspeople from Košice
Competitors at the 2001 World Games